Zelennik is a rural locality (a settlement) in Verkhnetoyemsky District, Arkhangelsk Oblast, Russia. The population was 706 as of 2010. There are 20 streets.

Geography 
Zelennik is located on the Severnaya Dvina River, 32 km northwest of Verkhnyaya Toyma (the district's administrative centre) by road. Andreyevskaya and Larionovskaya are the nearest rural localities.

References 

Rural localities in Verkhnetoyemsky District